Jorge W. Carow (April 20, 1874 – November 5, 1936) was an American politician and lawyer.

Born in Baraboo, Wisconsin, Carow received his bachelor's degree from University of Wisconsin–Madison and his law degree from University of Wisconsin Law School. Carow practiced law in Baraboo, Wisconsin and then moved to Ladysmith, Wisconsin where he continued to practice law. In 1928, Carow was elected as a Republican to the Wisconsin State Assembly. In 1934, Carow helped organized the Wisconsin Progressive Party and was elected speaker of the Wisconsin Assembly.

Notes

1874 births
1936 deaths
People from Ladysmith, Wisconsin
People from Baraboo, Wisconsin
University of Wisconsin–Madison alumni
University of Wisconsin Law School alumni
Wisconsin lawyers
Wisconsin Progressives (1924)
20th-century American politicians
Speakers of the Wisconsin State Assembly
Republican Party members of the Wisconsin State Assembly